Osama Talal Sabbah (born February 10, 1973) is a former Jordanian footballer who was a defender for Shabab Al-Ordon and the Jordan national football team until he retired and became managing director of Shabab Al-Ordon until August 2010. He then moved on to the Jordan national football team as director, taking Mohannad Mahadeen's place.

External links 
 
 
 Profile at the Jordan Football Association  

1973 births
Living people
Jordanian footballers
Jordan international footballers
Association football defenders
Al-Faisaly SC players
Sportspeople from Amman